Myrtle Avenue Line may refer to the following public transit lines:
BMT Myrtle Avenue Line, a fully elevated line of the New York City Subway, the last surviving remnant of one of the original Brooklyn elevated railroads
Myrtle Avenue Line (surface), a surface transit line on Myrtle Avenue, Brooklyn, New York; the first streetcar line in Brooklyn, now a bus route
Richmond Hill Line, a surface transit line on Myrtle Avenue in Queens, New York; originally a streetcar line, it was replaced in 1950 by a bus route